Mahadeepak Singh Shakya (25 July 1922 – 10 November 2020) was an Indian politician.

Career
He was the most senior and  prominent leader in Etah district and a member of Lok Sabha.  He was elected to Lok Sabha  for six terms from Etah in Uttar Pradesh state in India. He was a leader of Bharatiya Janata Party. He joined Congress Party in 2009, later rejoined BJP .

References 

People from Uttar Pradesh
1922 births
2020 deaths
Lok Sabha members from Uttar Pradesh
India MPs 1971–1977
India MPs 1977–1979
India MPs 1989–1991
India MPs 1991–1996
India MPs 1996–1997
India MPs 1998–1999
Bharatiya Janata Party politicians from Uttar Pradesh
Bharatiya Lok Dal politicians
People from Etah district
Janata Party politicians